Steve Miller (born February 28, 1992) is an American football defensive end who is a free agent. He played college football for the Ohio State Buckeyes.

References

1992 births
Living people
American football defensive ends
African-American players of American football
Players of American football from Canton, Ohio
Ohio State Buckeyes football players
Carolina Panthers players
21st-century African-American sportspeople